Brownkey Abdullahi is an activist and blogger who was born to Somali parents in Dadaab refugee camp in Kenya. She is the founder of the Brownkey Organization.

Early life 
Abdullahi was born to a Somali parents, who fled the Somalia Civil War in 1991, in Dadaab refugee camp. 

She started school while aged three. 

Abdullahi considers herself "Dadaabbian" neither Kenyan nor Somali.

Activism 
In 2013, Abdullahi started blogging, making her the first person to blog from Dadaab. Her blogging originally focused on countering negative rhetoric about Somali refugees before focusing on women's rights.

Career 
Abdullahi founded the Brownkey Organization, based in Dadaab, which advocates against female genital mutilation and gender based violence. In 2017, the foundation campaigned for better living conditions and for reform to camp policy.

Awards 
Abdullahi is a Akili Dada Fellow.

References 

1991 births
Living people
Youth activists
Refugees
Somalian bloggers
Somalian women bloggers
Feminist bloggers
Writers of blogs about home and family
African bloggers
Somalian activists
Somalian women activists